Peng Cuiting (born 31 July 2001) is a Chinese weightlifter, competing in the women's 76 kg category.

Career
Peng competed in national competitions breaking Chinese weightlifting records and unofficial world records in the snatch (123 kg in the women's -71 kg category & 125 kg in the women's -76 kg category).

Her first international competition is the 2022 Asian Weightlifting Championships, where she participated in the women's 76 kg category. She placed first.

Major Results

References

2001 births
Living people
21st-century Chinese women
Chinese female weightlifters